Saint Lucia competed at the 2011 World Aquatics Championships in Shanghai, China between July 16 and 31, 2011.

Swimming

Saint Lucia qualified 3 swimmers.

Men

Women

References

2011 in Saint Lucian sport
Nations at the 2011 World Aquatics Championships
Saint Lucia at the World Aquatics Championships